Fighting games are characterized by close combat between two fighters or groups of fighters of comparable strength, often broken into rounds or stocks. If multiple players are involved, players generally fight against each other.

Note: Games are listed in a "common English title/alternate title - developer" format, where applicable.

General

2D
Fighting games that use 2D sprites. Games tend to emphasize the height of attacks (high, medium, or low), and jumping.

Aggressors of Dark Kombat - ADK
Tōkidenshō Angel Eyes - Tecmo
Akatsuki EN-Eins series - Subtle Style
Akatsuki Shisei Ichigō
Akatsuki Blitzkampf
Akatsuki Blitzkampf Ausf. Achse
EN-Eins Perfektewelt
EN-Eins Perfektewelt Anastasis
Aquapazza: Aquaplus Dream Match / Examu
Arcana Heart series - Examu
Arcana Heart
Arcana Heart Full!
Arcana Heart 2
Suggoi! Arcana Heart 2
Arcana Heart 3
Arcana Heart 3: Love MAX!!!!!
Arcana Heart 3 Love Max: Six Stars!!!!!!
Arcana Heart 3 Love Max: Six Stars!!!!!! XTEND
Art of Fighting series - SNK
Art of Fighting
Art of Fighting 2
Art of Fighting 3: The Path of the Warrior
Astra Superstars - Sunsoft
Asura series - Fuuki
Asura Blade: Sword of Dynasty
Asura Buster: Eternal Warriors 
Asuka 120% series
Asuka 120% Burning Festival - Fill-in-Cafe
Asuka 120% Excellent Burning Festival - Fill-in-Cafe / FamilySoft
Asuka 120% Maxima Burning Festival - Fill-in-Cafe
Asuka 120% Special Burning Festival - FamilySoft
Asuka 120% Limited Burning Festival - Kodansha
Asuka 120% Final Burning Festival - FamilySoft / SUCCESS
Asuka 120% Return Burning Festival - FamilySoft
Avengers in Galactic Storm - Data East
Aazohm Krypht - Logitron
Bangkok Knights - System 3
Battle Blaze - American Sammy
Battle Beast - 7th Level
Battle K-Road - Psikyo
Battle Master: Kyuukyoku no Senshitachi - System Vision
Battle Monsters - Naxat Soft
BattleCry - Home Data
Barbarian series
Barbarian: The Ultimate Warrior / Death Sword - Palace Software
Barbarian II: The Dungeon of Drax / Axe of Rage - Palace Software
Best of Best - SunA
Bible Fight - This is Pop
Big Bang Beat - NRF Software
Bikini Karate Babes - Creative Edge Studios
Black Belt - Earthware Computer Services
Black Hole Assault - Micronet
Blandia - Allumer
BlazBlue series - Arc System Works
BlazBlue: Calamity Trigger
BlazBlue: Calamity Trigger Portable
BlazBlue: Continuum Shift
BlazBlue: Continuum Shift II
BlayzBloo: Super Melee Brawlers Battle Royale
BlazBlue: Continuum Shift Extend
BlazBlue: Chrono Phantasma
BlayzBloo: Clone Phantasma
BlazBlue: Chrono Phantasma Extend
BlazBlue: Central Fiction
BlazBlue: Cross Tag Battle
Blood Warrior / Ooedo Fight - Kaneko
BloodStorm - Incredible Technologies
Body Blows series
Body Blows - Team17
Body Blows Galactic - Team17
Ultimate Body Blows - Team17
Bounces - Denton Designs
Breakers/Breakers Revenge - Visco
Brutal: Paws of Fury series
Brutal: Paws of Fury - GameTek
Brutal Unleashed: Above the Claw - GameTek
Budokan: The Martial Spirit - Electronic Arts
Burning Rival - Sega
Capcom Fighting Evolution - Capcom
Capital Punishment - ClickBOOM
Capoeira Fighter series - Spiritonin
Capoeira Fighter
Capoeira Fighter 2
Capoeira Fighter 3
Catfight - Atlantean Interactive Games
Chinese Hero - Taiyo System
Chaos Code – FK Digital pty ltd.
Cho Aniki: Bakuretsu Ranto Hen - NCS
Chop Suey - English Software
Choy Lee Fut: Kung-Fu Warrior - Positive (company)
ClayFighter series - Interplay
ClayFighter
ClayFighter: Tournament Edition
ClayFighter 2 / ClayFighter 2: Judgement Clay / C2: Judgement Clay
ClayFighter 63⅓
ClayFighter: Sculptor's Cut
Crimson Alive - Keropyon
Crimson Alive: Genesis of The Heretic - Keropyon
Crimson Alive: Burst Again - Keropyon
Crimson Alive: Extreme Encounter - Keropyon
Cross Theater - ABC Maru
Cosmic Carnage - Sega
Cyberbots: Full Metal Madness - Capcom
Daemon Bride series - Examu
Daemon Bride - Examu
Daemon Bride: Additional Gain - Examu
Dangerous Streets - Micromania (video game developer)
Darkstalkers series - Capcom
Darkstalkers: The Night Warriors
Night Warriors: Darkstalkers' Revenge
Darkstalkers 3
Vampire Hunter 2: Darkstalkers' Revenge
Vampire Savior 2: The Lord of Vampire
Dengeki Bunko: Fighting Climax - French Bread
Dino Rex - Taito
Divekick - Iron Galaxy
Doomsday Warrior Taiketsu!! Brass Numbers(Japanese name) - Renovation Productions Inc.
Double Dragon: The Movie - Technos
Dr. Doom's Revenge - Empire Interactive
Draglade series - Dimps
Custom Beat Battle: Draglade
Draglade 2
Dragon: The Bruce Lee Story - Virgin
Dragon Ball Z (Arcade) - Banpresto
Dragon Master - Unico (video game company)
Dragoon Might - Konami
Duel 2000 - Coktel Vision
Eternal Champions series - Sega
Eternal Champions
Eternal Champions: Challenge from the Dark Side
Eternal Fighter Zero - Tasogare Frontier
Expect No Mercy
The Fallen Angels / Daraku Tenshi - Psikyo
Fatal Fury/Garou Densetsu series - SNK
Fatal Fury: King of Fighters
Fatal Fury 2
Fatal Fury Special
Fatal Fury 3: Road to the Final Victory
Real Bout Fatal Fury
Real Bout Fatal Fury Special
Real Bout Fatal Fury 2: The Newcomers
Real Bout Garou Densetsu Special: Dominated Mind
Fatal Fury: 1st Contact
Garou: Mark of the Wolves
Fighter's History series - Data East
Fighter's History
Fighter's History Dynamite
Fighter's History: Mizoguchi Kiki Ippatsu!!
Fightin' Spirit - Lightshock Software
Fighting Masters - Treco
Fighting Road - Toei Animation
Fist Fighter - Zeppelin
Fist of the North Star - Arc System Works
Fight Fever / Wang Jung Wang - Viccom
Flash Hiders series - Right Stuff
Flash Hiders
Battle Tycoon: Flash Hiders SFX
FOOTSIES series - HiFight
FOOTSIES
FOOTSIES: Rollback Edition
Fu'un series - SNK
Savage Reign
Kizuna Encounter: Super Tag Battle
Fuuka Taisen - Rei no Mono
Galactic Warriors - Konami
Galaxy Fight: Universal Warriors - Sunsoft
Gladiator - Domark
Glove on Fight - French-Bread
Golden Axe: The Duel - Sega
Guilty Gear series - Arc System Works
Gundam: Battle Assault series - Bandai
Head to Head Karate - Softdisk Publishing
Hercules: Slayer of the Damned - Gremlin Graphics
Hiryu no Ken series - Culture Brain
Hitman Reborn! DS: Flame Rumble - Tomy
Holosseum - Sega
Human Killing Machine / HKM - Tiertex
Immaterial and Missing Power - Twilight Frontier / Team Shanghai Alice
Insane Paine - Blast Process Games
InuYasha: A Feudal Fairy Tale - Bandai
International Karate series
International Karate / World Karate Championship - System 3
IK+ / International Karate + / Chop N' Drop - System 3
Istanbul Beyleri series - AKEMRE
Istanbul Beyleri
Istanbul Beyleri 2
JoJo's Bizarre Adventure - Capcom
Joy Mech Fight - Nintendo
Jump Stars series - Ganbarion
Jump Super Stars
Jump Ultimate Stars
Justice League Task Force - Blizzard Entertainment
Kabuki Klash: Far East Of Eden - Hudson Soft
Kaiser Knuckle / Global Champion / Dan-Ku-Ga - Taito
Karate Master Knock Down Blow - Crian Soft
Karate - Ultravision
Karate Champ - Technos Japan Corporation
Karate Combat - Superior Software
Karateka - Jordan Mechner
Kart Fighter - Cracked game featuring Mario
Kasumi Ninja - Hand Made Software
Kick Box Vigilante - Zeppelin
Killer Instinct series
Killer Instinct - Rare
Killer Instinct 2 - Rare
Killer Instinct Gold - Rare
The Killing Blade - IGS

The King of Fighters series - SNK
The King of Fighters '94
The King of Fighters '95
The King of Fighters '96
The King of Fighters '97
The King of Fighters '98
The King of Fighters '99
The King of Fighters 2000
The King of Fighters 2001
The King of Fighters 2002
The King of Fighters 2003
The King of Fighters Neowave
The King of Fighters XI
The King of Fighters XII
The King of Fighters XIII
Knight Games - English Software
Konjiki no Gash Bell Yuujou no Zakeru 2 - Banpresto
Konjiki no Gash Bell Yuujou no Zakeru Dream Tag Tournament - Banpresto
The Kung-Fu Master Jackie Chan / Jackie Chan in Fists of Fire: Jackie Chan Densetsu - Kaneko
Last Fight - Andromeda Software
Makeruna! Makendō 2: Kimero Youkai Souri - Success / Fill-in-Cafe
Maribato! - DK Soft
Martial Masters - IGS
Martial Champion - Konami
Marvel Super Heroes series - Capcom
X-Men: Children of the Atom
Marvel Super Heroes
Marvel vs. Capcom series - Capcom
X-Men vs. Street Fighter
Marvel Super Heroes vs. Street Fighter
Marvel vs. Capcom
Marvel vs. Capcom 2: New Age of Heroes
Master Axe: The Genesis of MysterX - Axe to Grind
Master Ninja: Shadow Warrior of Death - Paragon Software
Masters of Combat - SIMS Co., Ltd.
Matsumura Kunihiro Den: Saikyō no Rekishi o Nurikaero! - Shouei
Melty Blood series - Type-Moon / French-Bread / Ecole Software
Melty Blood: Type Lumina
Metal & Lace: Battle of the Robo Babes - Forest
Mighty Morphin Power Rangers series
Mighty Morphin Power Rangers (Sega Genesis)
Mighty Morphin Power Rangers (Sega Game Gear)
Mighty Morphin Power Rangers: The Movie  (Sega Game Gear)
Mighty Morphin Power Rangers: The Fighting Edition
Mighty Warriors - Electronic Devices/Electtronica Video-Games SRL
Million Arthur: Arcana Blood - Examu/Team Arcana
Million Knights Vermilion - NRF Software
Monster - 8105 Graphics
Mortal Kombat series - Midway
Mortal Kombat
Mortal Kombat II
Mortal Kombat 3
Ultimate Mortal Kombat 3
Mortal Kombat Trilogy
M.U.G.E.N
Neo Geo Battle Coliseum - SNK
New Mobile Report Gundam Wing: Endless Duel - Natsume
Ninja / Ninja Mission - Entertainment USA / Mastertronic
Ninja Hamster - CRL
Ninja Master's - ADK
Nitro Royale: Heroines Duel - Nitroplus
No Exit - Titus / Tomahawk
Ōgon Musōkyoku - 07th Expansion
One Must Fall: 2097 - Epic Games
Ragnagard/Shin-Oh-Ken - Saurus / System Vision
Osu!! Karate Bu - Culture Brain
Queen of Heart - Watanabe Seisakujo
Panza Kick Boxing / Best of the Best: Championship Karate - Loriciels
Persona 4 Arena - Arc System Works/Atlus
Persona 4 Arena Ultimax - Arc System Works/Atlus
Phantom Breaker - Mages (company)
Phantom Breaker: Extra - Mages (company)
Phantom Breaker: Omnia - Mages (company)
Photo Dojo - Nintendo
Pit-Fighter: The Ultimate Competition - Atari Games
Power Instinct/Goketsuji Ichizoku series - Atlus
Power Instinct
Power Instinct 2
Gogetsuji Legends
Groove on Fight
Matrimelee
Shin Goketsuji Ichizoku: Bonnou no Kaihou
Gōketsuji Ichizoku Matsuri Senzo Kuyou
Power Moves - Kaneko
Power Quest - Japan System Supply
Pray For Death - Virgin Interactive
Primal Rage series - Atari Games
Project Cerberus – Hobibox / Milestone
RABBIT - Aorn / Electronic Arts
Red Earth / Warzard - Capcom
Rage of the Dragons - Evoga / Noise Factory
Ranma ½ series
Ranma ½: Chōnai Gekitōhen - NCS
Ranma ½: Datou, Ganso Musabetsu Kakutou-ryuu! - NCS
Ranma ½: Hard Battle - Atelier Double
Ranma ½: Chougi Rambuhen - Rumic Soft
Ranma ½: Battle Renaissance - Rumic Soft
Rise of the Robots series - Mirage Media
Rise 2: Resurrection - Mirage Media
Rock, Paper, Scissors: Extreme Deathmatch - This is Pop
The Rumble Fish series - Dimps
The Rumble Fish
The Rumble Fish 2
Sango Fighter series - Panda Entertainment
Sango Fighter
Sango Fighter 2
Sai Combat - Mirrorsoft
Sailor Moon series - Angel
Samurai Deeper Kyo - Bandai
Samurai Shodown / Samurai Spirits series - SNK
Samurai Trilogy - Gremlin Graphics
Savage Warriors - Mindscape
Scarlet Weather Rhapsody - Twilight Frontier / Team Shanghai Alice
Schmeiser Robo – Hot B Co. Ltd.
Seifuku Densetsu Pretty Fighter - Genki / Sol
Sengoku Basara X - Capcom / Arc System Works
Shadow Fighter - Gremlin Graphics
Shadow: War of Succession - Tribeca Digital Studios
Shanghai Karate - Players
Shaq-Fu - Delphine
Shin Koihime Musō: Otome Taisen Sangokushi Engi - BaseSon
Shogun Warriors / Fujiyama Buster - Kaneko
Skullgirls - Reverge Labs/Lab Zero Games/Hidden Variable Studios/Future Club
Sokko Seitokai Sonic Council - Banpresto
SNK Gals' Fighters - SNK
SNK vs. Capcom series - Capcom / SNK
SnapDragon / Karate Chop - Bubble Bus
Sokko Seitokai: Sonic Council - Banpresto
Spectral vs. Generation -  Idea Factory / IGS
Spitting Image - Domark
Street Combat - NCS
Street Fighter series - Capcom
Street Fighter
Street Fighter II: The World Warrior
Street Fighter II: Champion Edition
Street Fighter II: Hyper Fighting
Super Street Fighter II: The New Challengers
Super Street Fighter II Turbo
Hyper Street Fighter II: The Anniversary Edition
Super Street Fighter II Turbo HD Remix
Ultra Street Fighter II: The Final Challengers
Street Fighter Alpha: Warriors' Dreams
Street Fighter Alpha 2
Street Fighter Alpha 2 Gold
Street Fighter Zero 2 Alpha
Street Fighter Alpha 3
Street Fighter Alpha Anthology
Street Fighter III
Street Fighter III: 2nd Impact
Street Fighter III: 3rd Strike
Street Fighter: The Movie - IT / Capcom
Street Smart - SNK
Strip Fighter series - Games Express
Sumo Wrestlers - HES
Super Black Belt Karate - Computer Applications
Super Cosplay War Ultra - Team FK
Super Fighter - C&E
Super Gem Fighter Mini Mix / Pocket Fighter - Capcom
Superior Soldiers / Perfect Soldiers - Irem
Survival Arts - Sammy
Swashbuckler - Paul Stephenson
Sword Slayer / Spartacus the Swordslayer - Players
Taekwon-Do - Human Entertainment
Tao Taido - Video System
Tattoo Assassins - Data East
Tatsunoko Fight - Takara
Teenage Mutant Ninja Turtles: Tournament Fighters - Konami
Thai Boxing - Anco Software
The Outfoxies - Namco
Thea Realm Fighters - High Voltage Software
Them's Fightin' Herds - Mane6
Time Killers - Incredible Technologies
Timeslaughter - Bloodlust Software
Tongue of the Fatman / Mondu's Fight Palace / Slaughter Sport / Fatman - Activision
Tough Guy - Panda Entertainment
Tuff E Nuff / Dead Dance - Jaleco
Twinkle Queen - Milestone
Uchi Mata / Brian Jack's Uchi Mata - Martech
Ultra Vortek - Atari
Under Night In-Birth - Type-Moon / French-Bread / Ecole Software
Untouchable - Creative Edge Studios
Urban Champion - Nintendo
Vanguard Princess - Sugeno
Vanguard Princess Prime - Sugeno
Variable Geo series - TGL / Giga
Violence Fight series
Violence Fight - Taito
Solitary Fighter / Violence Fight II - Taito
Virtua Fighter series
Virtua Fighter Animation - Aspect
Virtua Fighter 2 - Sega-AM2
Voltage Fighter Gowcaizer - Technos
VR Troopers - Syrox Developments
Waku Waku 7 - Sunsoft
Warriors of Elysia - Creative Edge Studios
The Way of the Exploding Fist series
The Way of the Exploding Fist / Kung-Fu: The Way of the Exploding Fist - Beam Software
Fist II: The Legend Continues / Fist: The Legend Continues / Exploding Fist II: The Legend Continues - Beam Software
Fist+ / Exploding Fist + - Beam Software
Way of the Tiger - Gremlin Graphics
Way of the Warrior - Naughty Dog
Weaponlord - Visual Concepts
Windy X Windam – Success / Ninja Studio
World Heroes series - ADK / SNK
Xuan Dou Zhi Wang / King of Combat - Jade Studio and Tencent Games
Yatagarasu Attack on Cataclysm - Yatagarasu Dev Team
Yie Ar Kung-Fu series
Yie Ar Kung-Fu - Konami / Imagine
Yie Ar Kung-Fu II: The Emperor Yie-Gah - Imagine / Konami
Yu Yu Hakusho Final - Namcot
Zatch Bell! Electric Arena / Konjiki no Gash Bell! Yuujou no Zakeru - Banpresto

2.5D
2.5D fighting games are displayed in full 3D graphics, but the gameplay is based on traditional 2D style games.

All Star Fighters - Essential Games
Avengers in Galactic Storm - Data East
Battle Fantasia - Arc System Works
Battle Stadium D.O.N. - Namco Bandai Games / Eighting / Q Entertainment
Blade Arcus from Shining - Sega
Blade Strangers - Studio Saizensen / Nicalis
Breakers - Visco
Canimals Fighters - Voozclub Co. Ltd / Playplus
Cartoon Network: Punch Time Explosion
Digimon Rumble Arena series - Namco Bandai Games
Digimon Rumble Arena
Digimon Rumble Arena 2
Dragon Ball FighterZ - Arc System Works
Dragon Blast - Dragon Tea
Dream Mix TV World Fighters - Hudson Soft
Fantasy Strike - Sirlin Games
Untitled Fatal Fury game - SNK
Fight of Gods - Digital Crafter
Fighter Uncaged Series
Fighters Uncaged - Ubisoft
Fighter Within - Ubisoft
Fighting EX Layer - Arika
Fullmetal Alchemist: Dream Carnival - Bandai / Eighting
Ganryu - Visco
Genei Tougi series - Racdym
Critical Blow
Guilty Gear series - Arc System Works
Guilty Gear Xrd
Guilty Gear Strive
Hinokakera - Reddish Region
Injustice series - Warner Bros. Interactive Entertainment / NetherRealm Studios
Injustice: Gods Among Us
Injustice 2
Killer Instinct (2013) - Double Helix Games / Iron Galaxy Studios
The King of Fighters series - SNK
The King of Fighters XIV
The King of Fighters XV
Kirby Fighters 2 - Nintendo / HAL Laboratory / Vanpool
Konjiki no Gash Bell!! Go! Go! Mamono Fight!! - Eighting
Marvel vs. Capcom (series) - Capcom
Marvel vs Capcom 3: Fate of Two Worlds
Ultimate Marvel vs. Capcom 3
Marvel vs. Capcom: Infinite
Mashbox - Microsoft Studios

Mortal Kombat series
Mortal Kombat - Warner Bros. Interactive Entertainment / NetherRealm Studios
Mortal Kombat X - Warner Bros. Interactive Entertainment / NetherRealm Studios
Mortal Kombat 11 - Warner Bros. Interactive Entertainment / NetherRealm Studios
Moshi Fighters - Mind Candy / Activision / Sumo Digital
MultiVersus - Warner Bros. Interactive Entertainment / Player First Games
Mythic Blades - Vermillion Entertainment
Naruto: Ultimate Ninja series - Namco Bandai Games
 - AOne Games
One Piece: Gear Spirit - Bandai
PlayStation All-Stars Battle Royale
Power Rangers: Battle for the Grid - Animoca Brands
Rakugakids - Konami
Rise of the Robots series - Mirage Media
Rise 2: Resurrection - Mirage Media
Rising Thunder - Radiant Entertainment
Samurai Shodown (2019) - SNK
Slap Happy Rhythm Busters - Polygon Magic
Street Fighter series  - Capcom
Street Fighter IV (2008)
Super Street Fighter IV (2010)
Super Street Fighter IV: 3D Edition
Super Street Fighter IV: Arcade Edition
Ultra Street Fighter IV
Street Fighter V
Street Fighter V: Arcade Edition
Street Fighter V: Champion Edition
Street Fighter 6
Street Fighter X Tekken - Capcom
Super Smash Bros. series - Nintendo / HAL Laboratory / Sora / Namco Bandai Games
Super Smash Bros.
Super Smash Bros. Melee
Super Smash Bros. Brawl
Super Smash Bros. for Nintendo 3DS / Wii U
Super Smash Bros. Ultimate
Tamagotchi Battle - Bandai Namco Games / Bandai
Tatsunoko vs. Capcom: Cross Generation of Heroes - Capcom
Tatsunoko vs. Capcom: Ultimate All-Stars - Capcom
Teenage Mutant Ninja Turtles: Smash-Up - Ubisoft / Game Arts
Viewtiful Joe: Red Hot Rumble - Capcom
Ultraman Nexus - Bandai
Punch Planet - Sector-K Games

3D
3D fighting games add three-dimensional movement. These often emphasize sidestepping.

.hack//Versus - Cyber Connect 2
ARMS - Nintendo
Ballz - Accolade
Battle Arena Toshinden series - Tamsoft
Battle Tryst - Konami
Bio F.R.E.A.K.S. - Saffire
Bloody Roar / Beastorizer series - Hudson / Eighting / Raizing
Buriki One - SNK
Capcom Fighting All-Stars - Capcom
Cardinal Syn - Kronos
Castlevania Judgment - Konami/Eighting
Celebrity Deathmatch - Big Ape
Criticom - Kronos
Custom Robo series - Noise
Dark Edge - Sega
Dark Rift - Kronos
Dead or Alive series - Team Ninja
Dead or Alive
Dead or Alive 2
Dead or Alive 3
Dead or Alive Ultimate
Dead or Alive 4
Dead or Alive: Dimensions
Dead or Alive 5
Dead or Alive 6
Deadly Arts - Konami
Def Jam series - Aki / EA Canada / EA Chicago
Destrega - Koei
Dragon Ball Z: Budokai (series) - Dimps
Dragon Ball Z: Budokai Tenkaichi series - Spike
Dragon Ball: Raging Blast - Spike
Dragon Ball: Raging Blast 2 - Spike
Dragon Ball Xenoverse - Bandai Namco
Dragon Ball Xenoverse 2 - Bandai Namco
Dual Heroes - Hudson Soft
Ehrgeiz - Dream Factory
Evil Zone - Yuke's
Fate/tiger colosseum - Capcom / Cavia / Type-Moon
Fate/unlimited codes - Capcom / Cavia / Eighting / Type-Moon
Fight for Life - Atari
Fighters Megamix - Sega-AM2
Fighter's Destiny series - Imagineer / Genki
Fighter's Impact series - Taito
Fighter's Impact
Fighter's Impact A
Fighting Bujutsu - Konami
Fighting Bujutsu 2nd!
Fighting Layer - Arika
Fighting Vipers - Sega-AM2
Fighting Vipers 2 - Sega-AM2
Final Fight Revenge - Capcom
FIST - Genki
FX Fighter series - Argonaut Games
FX Fighter
FX Fighter Turbo
Genei Tougi series - Racdym
Genei Tougi: Shadow Struggle
Girl Fight - Kung Fu Factory
Groove Adventure Rave: Fighting Live - Konami
 Heaven's Gate - Racdym
Hiryu no Ken series - Culture Brain
Flying Dragon - Culture Brain
Iron and Blood - Take-Two Interactive
JoJo's Bizarre Adventure: All Star Battle - Bandai Namco/CyberConnect2
JoJo's Bizarre Adventure: Eyes of Heaven - Bandai Namco/CyberConnect2
Kabuki Warriors - Genki (company) / Lightweight
Kakuto Chojin: Back Alley Brutal - Dream Publishing
Kensei: Sacred Fist - Konami
Killing Zone - Naxat Soft
Kinnikuman Muscle Grand Prix series - AKI Corporation / Banpresto
KOF: Maximum Impact series - SNK Playmore
Kung Fu Chaos - Just Add Monsters / Microsoft Game Studios
Legend of the Dragon - The Game Factory
Mace: The Dark Age - Midway
Magical Battle Arena - Fly-System / AreaZERO
 - Twelve Interactive
Marvel Avengers: Battle for Earth - Ubisoft
Marvel Nemesis: Rise of the Imperfects - Nihilistic / EA Canada / Team Fusion
Mortal Kombat series - Midway
Mortal Kombat 4
Mortal Kombat: Deadly Alliance
Mortal Kombat: Deception
Mortal Kombat: Armageddon
Mortal Kombat vs. DC Universe
Naruto: Clash of Ninja (series) - Eighting / Takara Tomy
Naruto: Ninja Destiny series (Nintendo DS)
Naruto: Ultimate Ninja Storm - Namco Bandai Games
Naruto Shippuden: Ultimate Ninja Storm 2
Naruto Shippuden: Ultimate Ninja Storm Generations
Naruto Shippuden: Ultimate Ninja Storm 3
Naruto Shippuden: Ultimate Ninja Storm Revolution
Naruto Shippuden: Ultimate Ninja Storm 4
One Must Fall: Battlegrounds
One Piece series - Ganbarion
One-Punch Man: A Hero Nobody Knows - Spike Chunsoft/Bandai Namco
Pokkén Tournament - Bandai Namco Entertainment

Power Stone series - Capcom
Power Stone
Power Stone 2
Poy Poy series - Konami
Poy Poy
Poy Poy 2
Psychic Force series - Taito
Psychic Force
Psychic Force 2012
Rival Schools series - Capcom
Rival Schools: United By Fate
Project Justice
Robo Pit - Kokopeli
Rumble Roses series - Yuke's / Konami
Shaolin - THQ
Shijō Saikyō no Deshi Kenichi: Gekitō! Ragnarok Hachikengō - Capcom
Sonic Battle - Sega/Sonic Team
Sonic The Fighters - Sega-AM2
Soulcalibur series - Namco/Bandai Namco
Soul Edge
Soulcalibur
Soulcalibur II
Soulcalibur III
Soulcalibur IV
Soulcalibur: Broken Destiny
Soulcalibur V
Soulcalibur: Lost Swords
Soulcalibur VI
Star Wars: Masters of Teras Kasi - LucasArts
Star Wars: The Clone Wars – Lightsaber Duels - LucasArts
Stake: Fortune Fighters - Gameness
Street Fighter EX series - Arika/Capcom
Street Fighter EX
Street Fighter EX Plus
Street Fighter EX Plus α
Street Fighter EX2
Street Fighter EX2 Plus
Street Fighter EX3
Star Gladiator series - Capcom
Super Dragon Ball Z - Namco Bandai Games
Tao Feng: Fist of the Lotus - Studio Gigante
Tech Romancer - Capcom
Tekken series - Namco
Tekken
Tekken 2
Tekken 3
Tekken Tag Tournament
Tekken 4
Tekken Advance
Tekken 5
Tekken 5: Dark Resurrection
Tekken 6
Tekken 6: Bloodline Rebellion
Tekken Tag Tournament 2
Tekken 3D: Prime Edition
Tekken Revolution
Tekken 7
Tekken 7: Fated Retribution
Tekken 8
Tenth Degree - Atari
Theatre Of Pain - Mirage Media
The Fight: Lights Out - SCE
The Grim Adventures of Billy & Mandy - Midway
Thrill Kill - Paradox Development
Time Warriors - Silmarils
Tobal series - Dream Factory
Tom and Jerry: War of the Whiskers - VIS Entertainment
Tournament of Legends - High Voltage Software
Toy Fighter - Anchor Inc
Transformers: Beast Wars Transmetals - Takara
Vs. - THQ
Virtua Fighter series - Sega-AM2 / Ryu Ga Gotoku Studio
Virtua Fighter
Virtua Fighter 2
Virtua Fighter 3
Virtua Fighter 4
Virtua Fighter 5
Virtual On series - Sega AM3
Virtual On: Cyber Troopers
Cyber Troopers Virtual-On Oratorio Tangram
War Gods - Midway
Warpath: Jurassic Park - Black Ops Entertainment / DreamWorks Interactive
Wu-Tang: Shaolin Style - Paradox Development
X: Unmei no Sentaku - Bandai
X-Men fighting games - Paradox Development / Activision
X-Men: Mutant Academy
X-Men: Mutant Academy 2
X-Men: Next Dimension
Xena: Warrior Princess: The Talisman of Fate - Saffire
Yu Yu Hakusho: Dark Tournament - Digital Fiction
Zatch Bell! Mamodo Battles / Konjiki no Gash Bell! Yuujou no Tag Battle 2 - Eighting
Zatch Bell! Mamodo Fury / Konjiki no Gash Bell! Gekitou! Saikyou no Mamonotachi - Mechanic Arms
Zeno Clash - ACE Team
Zero Divide series - ZOOM Inc.
Zero Divide
Zero Divide 2: The Secret Wish
Zero Divide: The Final Conflict

Weapon-based
Adding melee weapons to a fighting game often makes attack range more of a factor, as opponents may wield swords,knife,katana or other kind of weapons of drastically different sizes.

2D

Barbarian - Palace Software
Battle Blaze - American Sammy
Blade Arcus from Shining - Sega
Blandia - Allumer
BlazBlue series - Arc System Works
BlazBlue: Cross Tag Battle
Chaos Breaker / Dark Awake - Eolith / Taito
Dragoon Might - Konami
Dual Blades - Vivid Image
Fu'un series - SNK
Savage Reign
Kizuna Encounter
Gladiator - Domark
Guilty Gear series - Arc System Works
Guilty Gear: The Missing Link
Guilty Gear X
Guilty Gear X2
Guilty Gear Isuka - Sammy
Guilty Gear Dust Strikers
Hana no Keiji: Kumo no Kanata ni - Yojigen
Highlander - Ocean
Knight Games - English Software
Knuckle Heads - Namco
Samurai Deeper Kyo - Bandai
The Killing Blade - IGS
The Last Blade series - SNK
The Last Blade
The Last Blade 2

Martial Champion - Konami
Melty Blood - Type-Moon/French Bread
Melty Blood: Type Lumina - French Bread
Ninja Master's -Haoh-Ninpo-Cho- - Alpha Denshi
Persona 4 Arena - Atlus/Arc System Works
Persona 4 Arena Ultimax
Red Earth/War-Zard - Capcom
Revengers of Vengeance - Extreme Entertainment Group
Sai Combat - Mirrorsoft
Samurai Shodown/Samurai Spirits series - SNK
Sarayin Esrari - Akemre
Suiko Embu series
Outlaws of the Lost Dynasty / Suiko Enbu/Dark Legend - Data East
Suiko Enbu-Fuun Saiki - Data East
Shadow Fight series
Shadow Fight - Nekki
Shadow Fight 2 - Banzai.Games
Sword Slayer / Spartacus the Swordslayer - Players
Time Killers - Strata
Touhou Project series
Touhou Project 7.5 - Immaterial and Missing Power
Touhou Project 10.5 - Scarlet Weather Rhapsody
Touhou Project 12.3 - Touhou Hisōtensoku
Touhou Project 13.5 - Hopeless Masquerade
Touhou Project 14.5 - Urban Legend in Limbo
Touhou Project 15.5 - Antinomy of Common Flowers
Under Night In-Birth - French Bread/Ecole Software
WeaponLord - Namco

2.5D

Battle Fantasia - Arc System Works
Granblue Fantasy Versus - Arc System Works
Guilty Gear series - Arc System Works
Guilty Gear Xrd
Guilty Gear -Strive-
Mortal Kombat series
Mortal Kombat - NetherRealm Studios
Mortal Kombat X - NetherRealm Studios
Mortal Kombat 11 - NetherRealm Studios
Samurai Shodown (2019) - SNK
Shadow Fight series
Shadow Fight 3 - Banzai.Games
Shadow Fight Arena - Banzai.Games

3D

Battle Arena Toshinden series - Tamsoft
Bleach (video game series)
Bushido Blade series - Square-Enix / Lightweight
Bushido Blade
Bushido Blade 2
Cardinal Syn - Kronos
Criticom - Kronos Digital Entertainment / Vic Tokai
Dark Rift - Kronos Digital Entertainment / Vic Tokai
Deadliest Warrior: The Game - Pipeworks Software
Dynasty Warriors - Koei
Hellish Quart - Kubold
Kengo - Genki
Last Bronx - Sega AM3
Mace: The Dark Age - Midway

Mortal Kombat series
Mortal Kombat 4 - Midway
Mortal Kombat: Deadly Alliance - Midway
Mortal Kombat: Deception - Midway
Mortal Kombat: Armageddon - Midway
Samurai Shodown series
Samurai Shodown 64 - SNK
Samurai Shodown 64: Warriors Rage  SNK
Samurai Shodown: Warriors Rage - SNK
Samurai Shodown: Sen - SNK Playmore
Sarayin Esrari - Akemre
Soul series - Namco
Star Gladiator series
Star Gladiator - Capcom
Plasma Sword: Nightmare of Bilstein - Capcom
Star Wars: Masters of Teras Kasi - LucasArts
Star Wars: The Clone Wars – Lightsaber Duels - LucasArts

Tag team-based
Fighting games that feature tag teams as the core gameplay element. Teams of players may each control a different character, or a single player may control multiple characters but play one at a time. Other fighters feature tag-teaming as an alternate game mode.

2D

Blade Arcus from Shining - Sega
BlazBlue: Cross Tag Battle - Arc System Works
The Eye of Typhoon / Kyoku Cho Gou Ken - Viccom
Kizuna Encounter: Super Tag Battle - SNK
Marvel vs. Capcom series - Capcom
NeoGeo Battle Coliseum - SNK Playmore
Umineko: Golden Fantasia - 07th Expansion
The King of Fighters series - SNK/SNK Playmore
The King of Fighters 2003
The King of Fighters XI

Power Instinct series - Atlus
Gogetsuji Legends / Power Instinct Legends
Groove on Fight
Rage of the Dragons - Evoga / Noise Factory
Skullgirls - Reverge Labs/Lab Zero Games/Hidden Variable Studios/Future Club
SNK vs. Capcom: The Match of the Millennium
The Killing Blade - International Games System
Konjiki no Gash Bell! Yuujou no Zakeru Dream Tag Tournament - Banpresto

2.5D
Capcom Versus series
Tatsunoko vs. Capcom: Ultimate All-Stars - Capcom/Eighting
Marvel vs. Capcom 3: Fate of Two Worlds / Ultimate Marvel vs. Capcom 3 - Capcom/Eighting
Marvel vs. Capcom: Infinite - Capcom
Dragon Ball FighterZ - Arc System Works
Mortal Kombat - NetherRealm Studios
Power Rangers: Battle for the Grid - Animoca Brands
SNK Heroines: Tag Team Frenzy - SNK / Abstraction Games
Street Fighter X Tekken - Capcom

3D

Dead or Alive series - Tecmo
Dead or Alive 2
Dead or Alive 3
Dead or Alive Ultimate
Dead or Alive 4
Dead or Alive: Dimensions
Dead or Alive 5
Dead or Alive 5 Ultimate
Dead or Alive 5 Last Round

JoJo's Bizarre Adventure: All Star Battle R - Bandai Namco/CyberConnect2
JoJo's Bizarre Adventure: Eyes of Heaven - Bandai Namco/CyberConnect2
Jump Force - Spike Chunsoft
Marvel Avengers: Battle for Earth - Ubisoft
Naruto: Gekitou Ninja Taisen 3 - Eighting / Takara Tomy
Naruto: Gekitou Ninja Taisen 4 - Eighting / Takara Tomy
Naruto: Clash of Ninja Revolution 2 - Eighting / D3 Publisher / Takara Tomy
Naruto Shippuden: Clash of Ninja Revolution 3 - Eighting / D3 Publisher / Takara Tomy
Naruto Shippūden: Gekitō Ninja Taisen! Special - Eighting / Takara Tomy
One Piece: Burning Blood
One-Punch Man: A Hero Nobody Knows - Spike Chunsoft/Bandai Namco
Street Fighter EX3 - Arika/Capcom
Tekken Tag Tournament series - Namco
Tekken Tag Tournament
Tekken Tag Tournament 2

Platform fighters
While traditional 2D/3D fighting game mechanics are more or less descendants of Street Fighter II, platform fighters tend to blend fighting with elements taken from platform games. A typical match is arranged as a battle royal. Compared to traditional fighting games, attack inputs are simpler and emphasis is put on dynamic maneuvering in the arena, using the level design to get an advantage. Another major gameplay element involves using items, which may randomly spawn anywhere in the arena. Other terms which were used to refer to this sub-genre included "Smash Clones", "Party Brawler", "Party Fighter", and "Arena Fighter" (that is also being used to define another style of 3D fighting game).

2D

Armor Mayhem - Louissi
Blue Mischief - Team WING
Brawlhalla - Blue Mammoth Games
Guilty Gear Dust Strikers - Arc System Works
Jump Stars series - Ganbarion
Jump Super Stars
Jump Ultimate Stars
Kanon and AIR Smash - micro dream studio++

Lethal League - Team Reptile 
Paperbound - Dissident Logic
Rivals of Aether - Dan Fornace
Roof Rage - Early Melon
Shovel Knight Showdown - Yacht Club Games
Shrek: Fairy Tale Freakdown - Prolific
Sugoi Hebereke - Sunsoft
The Outfoxies - Namco
Them's Fightin' Herds - Maximum Games

2.5D

Antistatic - Blue Hexagons
Armajet - Super Bit Machine
Brawlout - Angry Mob Games
Cartoon Network: Punch Time Explosion - Papaya Studio
DreamMix TV World Fighters - Bitstep
Icons: Combat Arena - Wavedash Games
Kirby Fighters 2 - Nintendo / HAL Laboratory / Vanpool
Konjiki no Gash Bell!! Go! Go! Mamono Fight!! - Eighting
Kung Fu Panda: Showdown of Legendary Legends - Vicious Cycle Software
Lethal League Blaze - Team Reptile
MultiVersus - Warner Bros. Interactive Entertainment / Player First Games
Neon Genesis Evangelion: Battle Orchestra - Headlock
Nickelodeon All-Star Brawl - Ludosity / Fair Play Labs
One Piece: Gear Spirit - Bandai

Onimusha Blade Warriors - Capcom
PlayStation All-Stars Battle Royale - SuperBot Entertainment
Rumble Arena - Rekall Games
Rushdown Revolt - Vortex Games
Slap City - Ludosity
Super Smash Bros. series - Nintendo / HAL Laboratory / Sora / Bandai Namco Studios
Super Smash Bros.
Super Smash Bros. Melee
Super Smash Bros. Brawl
Super Smash Bros. for Nintendo 3DS / Wii U
Super Smash Bros. Ultimate
Tales of VS. - Matrix Software
Teenage Mutant Ninja Turtles: Smash Up - Game Arts
Viewtiful Joe: Red Hot Rumble - Capcom

3D

ARMS - Nintendo
Barbarian - Saffire
The Grim Adventures of Billy & Mandy (video game) - Midway Games
Groove Adventure Rave: Fighting Live - Konami
JoJo's Bizarre Adventure: Eyes of Heaven - Bandai Namco/CyberConnect2
Keriotosse! - Taya
Kung Fu Chaos - Just Add Monsters / Microsoft Game Studios
Pocket Kanon & Air - Studio SiestA
Power Stone series - Capcom
Power Stone
Power Stone 2
Poy Poy series - Konami
Poy Poy
Poy Poy 2

Rakugaki Showtime - Treasure
Shrek SuperSlam - Activision
Sonic Battle - Sega/Sonic Team
Stake: Fortune Fighters - Gameness Art Software Inc.
Suzumiya Haruhi no Chourantou - Souvenir Circ.
Suzumiya Haruhi no Gekitou - Souvenir Circ.
Teenage Mutant Ninja Turtles: Mutant Melee - Konami
Tom and Jerry: War of the Whiskers - VIS Entertainment

Arena fighting games
Arena Fighters usually focuses on more free-controlling 3D movement and camera that follows the character, unlike other traditional 3D fighting games like the Tekken series that still maintain the side view and side-scrolling orientation to the attacks, also usually put emphasis on offense over defense. Games are often based on popular anime series or other IPs.

3D

ARMS - Nintendo
Castlevania Judgment - Konami
Demon Slayer: Kimetsu no Yaiba – The Hinokami Chronicles - CyberConnect2
Dissidia: Final Fantasy
Dissidia 012 Final Fantasy
Dragon Ball Z: Budokai Tenkaichi (series) - Spike
Dragon Ball: Raging Blast - Spike
Dragon Ball: Raging Blast 2 - Spike
Dragon Ball Xenoverse - Bandai Namco
Dragon Ball Xenoverse 2 - Bandai Namco
The Grim Adventures of Billy & Mandy (video game) - Midway Games
Groove Adventure Rave: Fighting Live - Konami
Godzilla video games - Toho / Atari

Kill la Kill the Game: IF - A+ Games/Arc System Works
King of the Monsters series - SNK
Kung Fu Chaos - Just Add Monsters/Microsoft Game Studios
JoJo's Bizarre Adventure: Eyes of Heaven - Bandai Namco/CyberConnect2
J-Stars Victory VS - Spike Chunsoft
Jump Force - Spike Chunsoft/Bandai Namco
Marvel Avengers: Battle for Earth - Ubisoft
Naruto: Ultimate Ninja Storm
Naruto Shippuden: Ultimate Ninja Storm 2
Naruto Shippuden: Ultimate Ninja Storm Generations
Naruto Shippuden: Ultimate Ninja Storm 3
Naruto Shippuden: Ultimate Ninja Storm Revolution

One-Punch Man: A Hero Nobody Knows - Spike Chunsoft/Bandai Namco
Override 2: Super Mech League
Power Stone series - Capcom
Power Stone
Power Stone 2
Pokkén Tournament - Bandai Namco Entertainment
Saint Seiya: Brave Soldiers - Dimps
Saint Seiya: Soldiers' Soul - Dimps
Shijō Saikyō no Deshi Kenichi: Gekitō! Ragnarok Hachikengō - Capcom
Shrek SuperSlam - Activision
Sonic Battle - Sega/Sonic Team
Spawn: In the Demon's Hand
Star Wars: The Clone Wars - Lightsaber Duels - Lucasfilm Games
Super Dragon Ball Z - Bandai
Virtual On series - Sega AM3
Virtual On: Cyber Troopers
Cyber Troopers Virtual-On Oratorio Tangram
War of the Monsters  Guerra de los monstruos  - Incognito Entertainment / Sony
Yu Yu Hakusho: Dark Tournament - Digital Fiction
Zatch Bell! Mamodo Battles / Konjiki no Gash Bell! Yuujou no Tag Battle 2 - Eighting
Zatch Bell! Mamodo Fury / Konjiki no Gash Bell! Gekitou! Saikyou no Mamonotachi - Mechanic Arms

4-way simultaneous fighting
Games in which four players face off at once. Other games may feature 4-way fighting as alternate game modes, but here it's more central to the way the game is usually played.

2D

Bleach Nintendo DS games
Bleach: The Blade of Fate
Bleach: Dark Souls
Guilty Gear series - Arc System Works
Guilty Gear Isuka - Sammy
Guilty Gear: Dust Strikers

Jump Stars series - Ganbarion
Jump Super Stars
Jump Ultimate Stars
Lethal League - Team Reptile
Naruto Shippūden: Ninjutsu Zenkai! Cha-Crash!!
Twinkle Queen - Milestone
 Yū Yū Hakusho Makyō Tōitsusen

2.5D

Battle Stadium D.O.N - Eighting
Cartoon Network: Punch Time Explosion - Crave
DreamMix TV World Fighters - Hudson Soft
Kirby Fighters 2 - Nintendo / HAL Laboratory / Vanpool
Konjiki no Gash Bell!! Go! Go! Mamono Fight!! - 8ing
Lethal League Blaze - Team Reptile
MultiVersus - Warner Bros. Interactive Entertainment / Player First Games
Neon Genesis Evangelion: Battle Orchestra - Headlock
Nickelodeon All-Star Brawl - Ludosity / Fair Play Labs
One Piece: Gear Spirit - Bandai

PlayStation All-Stars Battle Royale - Sony Computer Entertainment
Sonic Battle - Sega / Sonic Team
Street Fighter X Tekken - Capcom
Super Smash Bros. series - Nintendo / HAL Laboratory / Sora / Bandai Namco Studios
Super Smash Bros.
Super Smash Bros. Melee
Super Smash Bros. Brawl
Super Smash Bros. for Nintendo 3DS / Wii U
Super Smash Bros. Ultimate
Teenage Mutant Ninja Turtles: Smash-Up - Ubisoft/Game Arts
Viewtiful Joe: Red Hot Rumble - Capcom

3D

ARMS - Nintendo
Destrega - Koei
The Grim Adventures of Billy & Mandy - Midway Games
Groove Adventure Rave: Fighting Live - Konami
JoJo's Bizarre Adventure: Eyes of Heaven - Bandai Namco/CyberConnect2
Naruto: Clash of Ninja (series) - Eighting / Takara Tomy
Naruto: Clash of Ninja 2
Naruto: Clash of Ninja Revolution
Naruto: Clash of Ninja Revolution 2
Naruto: Gekitō Ninja Taisen! 3
Naruto: Gekitō Ninja Taisen! 4
Naruto Shippuden: Clash of Ninja Revolution 3
Naruto Shippūden: Gekitō Ninja Taisen! EX
Naruto Shippūden: Gekitō Ninja Taisen! EX 2
Naruto Shippūden: Gekitō Ninja Taisen! EX 3
Naruto Shippūden: Gekitō Ninja Taisen! Special

Power Stone 2 - Capcom
Shrek SuperSlam - Activision
Sonic Battle - Sonic Team/Sega
Teenage Mutant Ninja Turtles: Mutant Melee - Konami
Thrill Kill - Virgin Interactive
Wu-Tang: Shaolin Style - Activision

Sports (combat) subgenres
Sports-based combat (also known as sport-fighters or combat sports games) are games that fall firmly within both the Combat and Sports game genres. Such games are usually based on boxing, mixed martial arts, and wrestling, and each sport seen as their own separate subgenres. Often the combat is far more realistic than combat in fighting games (though the amount of realism can vary greatly), and many feature real-world athletes and franchises and they also very distinct from fighting games.

Boxing
Boxing games go back farther than any other kind of fighting game, starting with Sega's Heavyweight Champ in 1976, the game often called the first video game to feature hand-to-hand fighting. Fighters wear boxing gloves and fight in rings, and fighters can range from actual professional boxers to aliens to Michael Jackson.

10... Knock Out! - Amersoft
3D Boxing - Amsoft
3D World Boxing Champion - Simulmondo
4-D Boxing - Distinctive Software
4D Sports Boxing - Mindscape
ABC Wide World of Sports Boxing - Cinemaware
Animal Boxing - Destineer
ARMS - Nintendo
Barry McGuigan World Championship Boxing / Star Rank Boxing - Gamestar / Activision
Best Bout Boxing - Jaleco
Boxing - Activision
Boxing - Mattel Electronics
Boxing Angel
Boxing Fever
Boxing Legends of the Ring - Sculptured Software
Black & Bruised - Majesco Entertainment
By Fair Means or Foul / Pro Boxing Simulator - Superior Software / Alligata / Codemasters
Canimals Boxing Championship - Voozclub Co. Ltd / Playplus
Def Jam: Icon - EA Chicago/Electronic Arts
Devastating Blow - Beyond Belief
Evander "Real Deal" Holyfield's Boxing - Sega
FaceBreaker - EA Canada
Final Blow - Taito / STORM (The Sales Curve)
Fight Night (1985) - Accolade / U.S. Gold
Fight Night series
Fight Night 2004 - EA Sports
Fight Night Round 2 - EA Sports
Fight Night: Round 3 - EA Chicago
Fight Night Round 4 - EA Canada
Fight Night Champion - EA Canada
Foes of Ali - Gray Matter Studios
Frank Bruno's Boxing - Elite
George Foreman's KO Boxing - Beam Software
Greatest Heavyweights of the Ring - Sega
Hajime no Ippo: Road to Glory
Heavyweight Champ series
Heavyweight Champ (1976)
Heavyweight Champ (1987)
Knockout - Alligata
Knockout Kings series - EA Sports
Knockout Kings 99
Knockout Kings
Knockout Kings 2000
Knockout Kings 2001
Knockout Kings 2002
Knockout Kings 2003
Legend of Success Joe - Wave Corp. / SNK
Muhammad Ali Heavyweight Boxing - Park Place
Neutral Corner / USA Boxing - KAB Software
Online Boxing series
Online Boxing 2D(2001) - onlineboxing.net
Online Boxing 3D(2009) - 3dboxing.com
Poli Diaz - OperaSoft
Power Punch II - ASC
Pro Boxing - Artworx

Punch-Out!! series - Nintendo
Punch-Out!!
Super Punch-Out!!
Mike Tyson's Punch-Out!!
Super Punch-Out!! (SNES)
Punch-Out!! (Wii)
Prize Fighter
Ready 2 Rumble series
Ready 2 Rumble Boxing - Midway
Ready 2 Rumble Boxing: Round 2 - Midway / Point of View (developer)
Ready 2 Rumble Revolution - AKI Corporation / Atari
Real Steel - Yuke's
Riddick Bowe Boxing - Malibu Interactive
Ring King - Data East
Ringside - EAS / Mentrox / Goldline
Rocky series
Creed: Rise to Glory - Survios
Rocky Super Action Boxing - Coleco
Rocky - Sega
Rocky (6th gen consoles) - Ubisoft
Rocky Legends - Ubisoft
Rocky Balboa - Ubisoft
Rocky / Rocco - Dinamic / Gremlin
Sierra Championship Boxing - Sierra On-Line
Star Rank Boxing II - Gamestar / Activision
Street Cred Boxing - Players
TKO - Accolade
Teleroboxer - Nintendo R&D3
The Big KO - Tynesoft
The Champ - Linel
The Final Round (1988) - Konami
Title Fight - Sega
Undisputed - Steel City Interactive
Victorious Boxers series
Victorious Boxers: Ippo's Road to Glory - New Corporation
Victorious Boxers 2: Fighting Spirit - New Corporation
Victorious Boxers: Revolution - AQ Interactive / GrandPrix
Wade Hixton's Counter Punch - Inferno Games
Wii Sports: Wii Boxing - Nintendo

Boxing management
Boxing games where combat is not directly human-controlled in the ring. Instead, a boxer is trained via a resource management game scheme, and bouts are directed via instructions given prior to each round.

Boxing Manager - Cult
Online Boxing Manager - OBM
Ringside Seat - SSI
TKO Professional Boxing - Lance Haffner Games
The Boxer (game) - Cult
World Championship Boxing Manager - Goliath Games / Krisalis Software
World Championship Boxing Manager Online - WCBM Online

Mixed martial arts
While most versus fighting games could be considered mixed martial arts games, listed here are games that are based on actual MMA franchises or tournaments.

Astral Bout / Sougou Kakutougi Astral Bout - King Records
Astral Bout 2 / Sougou Kakutougi Astral Bout 2 The Total Fighters - King Records
Astral Bout 3 / Fighting Network Rings: Astral Bout 3 / Sougou Kakutougi Astral Bout 3 - King Records
Buriki One - SNK
Def Jam: Fight for NY - Aki / EA Canada
EA Sports MMA - EA Sports
EA Sports UFC - EA Sports
EA Sports UFC 2 - EA Sports
EA Sports UFC 3 - EA Sports
EA Sports UFC 4 - EA Sports
Fighting Network RINGS: PS one 1997
Grappler Baki Baki Sadai no Tournament / Fighting Fury PS2 2000
Garouden Breakblow PS2 2005
Garouden Breakblow Fist or Twist PS2 2007
K-1 PREMIUM 2004 Dynamite PS2 2004
K-1 PREMIUM 2005 Dynamite PS2 2005
MMA Tycoon - Browser 2009
PRIDE FC: Fighting Championships PS2 2003
PrideGP Grand Prix 2003
TDT-Online - TDT
TheFlyingKnee - Browser/Animated 2011
The Ishu Kakutougi/World Fighting PS2 2003
The Wild Rings Xbox 2003
Ultimate Fighting Championship - Anchor Inc.
UFC: Sudden Impact - Opus
UFC: Tapout - Dream Factory
UFC: Throwdown - Opus
UFC 2009 Undisputed - Yuke's
UFC Undisputed 2010 - Yuke's
UFC Undisputed 3 - Yuke's
UFC Personal Trainer (video game) - Yuke's
Saikyō: Takada Nobuhiko Super Famicom 1995
Supremacy MMA - Kung Fu Factory

Kickboxing
K-1 World GP
K-1 World GP 2006
K-1 Premium 2005 Dynamite!!
K-1 World GP 2005
K-1 World Max 2005
K-1 Premium 2004 Dynamite!!
K-1 World Grand Prix 2003
K-1 World Grand Prix: The Beast Attack!
K-1 World Grand Prix
K-1 Pocket Grand Prix 2
K-1 Pocket Grand Prix
K-1 World Grand Prix 2001
K-1 World Grand Prix 2001 Kaimakuden
K-1 Oujya ni Narou!
K-1 Grand Prix
K-1 Revenge
Legend of K-1 Grand Prix '96
K-1 The Arena Fighters
Fighting Illusion K-1 Grand Prix Sho
Legend of K-1 The Best Collection

Wrestling

Wrestling games are either based on or have elements of wrestling, such as professional wrestling, grappling, and/or the wrestling ring itself.

Super Pro Wrestling - INTV Corporation
3 Count Bout / Fire Suplex - SNK
All Japan Pro-Wrestling: Soul of Champion - Human Entertainment
All Star Pro-Wrestling series - Square / Square Enix
American Tag Team Wrestling / Tag Team Wrestling - Zeppelin
Backyard Wrestling series - Paradox Development
Backyard Wrestling: Don't Try This at Home
Backyard Wrestling 2: There Goes the Neighborhood
Backyard Wrestling 2K8
The Big Pro Wrestling! / Tag Team Wrestling - Technos / Quicksilver Software
Blazing Tornado - Human Entertainment
Body Slam / Dump Matsumoto - Sega / Firebird
 Pro Wrestling (Sega Master System) - Sega
Championship Wrestling (video game) - Epyx
Def Jam Vendetta - Aki / EA Canada
Fire Pro Wrestling series
Fire Pro Wrestling Combination Tag - Human Entertainment
Fire Pro Wrestling 2nd Bout - Human Entertainment
Super Fire Pro Wrestling - Human Entertainment
Thunder Pro Wrestling Biographies / Fire Pro Wrestling Gaiden - Human Entertainment
Fire Pro Wrestling 3 Legend Bout - Human Entertainment
Super Fire Pro Wrestling 2 - Human Entertainment
Super Fire Pro Wrestling 3 Final Bout - Human Entertainment
Super Fire Pro Wrestling 3 Easy Type - Human Entertainment
Fire Pro Women: All Star Dream Slam / Fire Pro Joshi: All Star Dream Slam - Human Entertainment
Super Fire Pro Wrestling Special - Human Entertainment
Wrestling Universe: Fire Pro Women: Dome Super Female Big Battle: All Japan Women VS J.W.P. - Human Entertainment
Super Fire Pro Wrestling: Queen's Special - Human Entertainment
Fire Pro Another Story: Blazing Tornado - Human Entertainment
Super Fire Pro Wrestling X - Human Entertainment
Fire Pro Wrestling: Iron Slam '96 - Human Entertainment
Super Fire Pro Wrestling X Premium - Human Entertainment
Fire Pro Wrestling S: 6 Men Scramble - Human Entertainment
Fire Pro Wrestling G - Human Entertainment
Fire Pro Wrestling for WonderSwan - Spike
Fire Pro Wrestling i - Spike
Fire Pro Wrestling D - Spike
Fire Pro Wrestling - Spike
Fire Pro Wrestling J - Spike
Fire Pro Wrestling 2 - Spike
Fire Pro Wrestling Z - Spike
Fire Pro Wrestling Returns - Spike
Fire Pro Wrestling World - Spike

Gekitou Burning Pro Wrestling - BPS
HAL Wrestling / Pro Wrestling - Human Entertainment
HammerLock Wrestling - Jaleco
Funaki Masakatsu no Hybrid Wrestler: Tōgi Denshō - Technos
Intergalactic Cage Match / Cage Match - Mastertronic / Entertainment USA
King of Colosseum (Green) NOAH x Zero-One Disc - Spike
King of Colosseum II - Spike
Galactic Wrestling / Kinnikuman Generations - Bandai
Legends of Wrestling series
MUSCLE / Tag Team Match M.U.S.C.L.E. / Kinnikuman Muscle Tag Match - Bandai
Mat Mania Challenge - Technos / Atari
Natsume Championship Wrestling - Natsume
New Japan x All Japan x Pancrase Disc - Spike
Popeye 3 - Alternative
Power Move Pro Wrestling - Future Amusement
Power Pro Wrestling: Max Voltage / Jikkyou Power Pro Wrestling '96: Max Voltage - Konami
Pro Wrestling (NES) - Nintendo
Pure Wrestle Queens / JWP Joshi Pro Wrestling: Pure Wrestle Queens - Jaleco
Cutie Suzuki no Ringside Angel - Asmik
Rock'n Wrestle / Bop'n Wrestle - Beam Software
Rumble Roses series - Konami / Yuke's
Saturday Night Slam Masters series
Saturday Night Slam Masters / Muscle Bomber: The Body Explosion - Capcom
Muscle Bomber Duo: Ultimate Team Battle / Muscle Bomber Duo: Heat Up Warriors - Capcom
Ring of Destruction: Slam Masters II / Super Muscle Bomber: The International Blowout - Capcom
Sgt Slaughter's Mat Wars - Mindscape
Shin Nihon Pro Wrestling Tokon Hono series - Yuke's
Shin Nihon Pro Wrestling Tokon Hono: Brave Spirits
Shin Nihon Pro Wrestling Tokon Hono 2: The Next Generation
The Simpsons Wrestling - Big Ape Productions
Stardust Suplex - Varie
Super Star Pro Wrestling - Nihon Bussan
Take Down - Gamestar
Tecmo World Wrestling - Tecmo
Title Match Pro Wrestling - Absolute Entertainment
TNA Impact! - Midway
TNA Impact!: Cross The Line - Midway
Wrestling - KAB Software
Wrestle Kingdom - Yuke's
Wrestle Kingdom 2 - Yuke's
Wrestle War - Sega
Wrestling Superstars - Codemasters

Wrestling video games based on WWE/WWF properties.

Extreme Championship Wrestling (ECW) series
ECW Anarchy Rulz - Acclaim
ECW Hardcore Revolution - Acclaim
SmackDown! series - THQ / Yuke's
WWF SmackDown!
WWF SmackDown! 2: Know Your Role
WWF SmackDown! Just Bring It
WWE SmackDown! Shut Your Mouth
WWE SmackDown! Here Comes The Pain
WWE SmackDown! vs. RAW
WWE SmackDown! vs. RAW 2006
WWE SmackDown vs. Raw 2007
WWE SmackDown vs. Raw 2008
WWE SmackDown vs. Raw 2009
WWE SmackDown vs. Raw 2010
WWE SmackDown vs. Raw 2011
World Championship Wrestling (WCW) series
WCW Backstage Assault
WCW Mayhem
WCW Nitro
WCW/nWo Revenge
WCW/nWo Thunder
WCW SuperBrawl Wrestling
WCW: The Main Event
WCW vs. nWo: World Tour
WCW vs. the World
WCW Wrestling

WrestleMania series
WWF WrestleMania - Acclaim
WWF WrestleMania Challenge - LJN
WWF WrestleMania (Microcomputer) - Ocean
WWF Super WrestleMania - LJN
WWF WrestleMania: Steel Cage Challenge - LJN
WWF WrestleMania: The Arcade Game - Midway
WWF Road to WrestleMania - Natsume
WWE Road to WrestleMania X8 - Natsume
WWF WrestleMania 2000 - AKI
WWE WrestleMania X8 - Yuke's
WWE WrestleMania XIX - Yuke's
WWE WrestleMania 21 - Studio Gigante
WWE Legends of WrestleMania - Yuke's
 WWF/WWE series
MicroLeague Wrestling - MicroLeague
WWE '12 - Yuke's
WWE 13 - Yuke's
WWE 2K14 - Yuke's
WWE 2K15 - Yuke's
WWE 2K16 - Yuke's
WWE 2K17 - Yuke's
WWE 2K18 - Yuke's
WWE 2K19 - Yuke's
WWE 2K20 - Yuke's
WWE All-Stars - THQ
WWF Superstars - Technos
WWF WrestleFest - Technos
WWF Superstars (Game Boy) - LJN
WWF Superstars 2 - LJN
WWF European Rampage Tour - Ocean
WWF Royal Rumble - LJN
WWF RAW - LJN
WWF King of the Ring - LJN
WWF Rage in the Cage - Acclaim
WWF In Your House - Acclaim
WWF War Zone - Acclaim
WWF Attitude - Acclaim
WWF No Mercy - AKI
WWF Royal Rumble (Dreamcast) - Yuke's
WWE RAW - Anchor
WWE RAW 2 - Anchor
WWE Survivor Series - Natsume
WWE Day of Reckoning - Yuke's
WWE Day of Reckoning 2 - Yuke's

Ball/Disc sports
Games involving flying objects that can include balls and discs, where the players can only interact with each other through the object, and may or may not include goalposts.

Lethal League series - Team Reptile
Lethal League
Lethal League Blaze

Windjammers series - Data East / Dotemu
Windjammers - Data East
Windjammers 2 - Dotemu

By theme

Anime-based fighting games
Games based on popular anime series and 3D variants often feature cell shading. "Anime fighters" also usually have very fast-paced action and put emphasis on offense over defense. Another common feature is that they typically have fighting systems built around doing long combos of dozens of attacks. But overall they appear in a variety of fighting game sub-genres.

2D

Akatsuki EN-Eins series - Subtle Style
Arcana Heart series - Examu/Team Arcana
BlazBlue series - Arc System Works
BlazBlue: Cross Tag Battle
Chaos Code - FK Digital
Dragon Ball Z: Super Butōden - TOSE/BandaiDragon Ball Z: Super Butōden 2
Dragon Ball Z: Super Butōden 3Dragon Ball Z: Shin ButōdenDragon Ball Kai: Ultimate Butoden - Bandai Namco/Game RepublicDragon Ball Z: Extreme Butōden - Bandai Namco/Arc System WorksDragon Ball Z: Supersonic Warriors series - BandaiFist of the North Star: The Twin Blue Stars of Judgment - Arc System WorksGuilty Gear series - Arc System WorksGuilty Gear: The Missing LinkGuilty Gear XGuilty Gear X2Guilty Gear Isuka - SammyGuilty Gear Dust StrikersJump Stars series - GanbarionJump Super StarsJump Ultimate StarsJoJo's Bizarre Adventure: Heritage for The Future - CapcomMelty Blood series - Type-Moon/French BreadMelty Blood: Type LuminaNitroplus Blasterz: Heroines Infinite Duel - Examu/Team Arcana
Persona 4 Arena - Atlus/Arc System Works
Persona 4 Arena Ultimax - Atlus/Arc System Works
Phantom Breaker - Mages (company)
Skullgirls - Reverge Labs/Lab Zero Games/Hidden Variable Studios/Future Club
Tatsunoko Fight - Takara
Under Night In-Birth - French Bread

2.5D

Battle Stadium D.O.N. - Namco Bandai Games/Eighting/Q Entertainment
DNF Duel - Neople/Arc System Works/Eighting
Dragon Ball FighterZ - Arc System Works
Dream Mix TV World Fighters - Hudson Soft
Granblue Fantasy Versus - Cygames/Arc System Works
Guilty Gear series - Arc System Works
Guilty Gear Xrd
Guilty Gear -Strive-
One Piece: Grand Battle! - Bandai
One Piece: Gear Spirit - Bandai
Tatsunoko vs. Capcom - Capcom/Eighting

3D

Dead or Alive (franchise) - Koei Tecmo
Demon Slayer: Kimetsu no Yaiba – The Hinokami Chronicles - CyberConnect2
Dragon Ball GT: Final Bout - TOSE/Bandai
Dragon Ball Z: Budokai (series) - Dimps
Dragon Ball Z: Budokai Tenkaichi (series) - Spike
Dragon Ball Z: Burst Limit - Dimps
Dragon Ball Z: Infinite World - Dimps
Dragon Ball: Raging Blast - Spike
Dragon Ball: Raging Blast 2 - Spike
Dragon Ball Xenoverse - Bandai Namco
Dragon Ball Xenoverse 2 - Bandai Namco
Fate/unlimited codes - Type-Moon/Eighting/Capcom
Groove Adventure Rave: Fighting Live - Konami
Hokuto no Ken: Raoh Gaiden - Ten no Haoh - Interchannel/Arc System Works
JoJo's Bizarre Adventure: All Star Battle - Bandai Namco/CyberConnect2
JoJo's Bizarre Adventure: Eyes of Heaven - Bandai Namco/CyberConnect2
J-Stars Victory VS - Bandai Namco
Jump Force - Spike Chunsoft/Bandai Namco
Kill la Kill the Game: IF - A+ Games/Arc System Works
Naruto: Clash of Ninja (series) - Eighting / Takara Tomy
Naruto: Clash of Ninja 2
Naruto: Clash of Ninja Revolution
Naruto: Clash of Ninja Revolution 2
Naruto: Gekitō Ninja Taisen! 3
Naruto: Gekitō Ninja Taisen! 4
Naruto Shippuden: Clash of Ninja Revolution 3
Naruto Shippuden: Clash of Ninja for Wii U
Naruto Shippūden: Gekitō Ninja Taisen! EX
Naruto Shippūden: Gekitō Ninja Taisen! EX 2
Naruto Shippūden: Gekitō Ninja Taisen! EX 3
Naruto Shippūden: Gekitō Ninja Taisen! Special
Naruto: Ultimate Ninja Storm
Naruto Shippuden: Ultimate Ninja Storm 2
Naruto Shippuden: Ultimate Ninja Storm Generations
Naruto Shippuden: Ultimate Ninja Storm 3
Naruto Shippuden: Ultimate Ninja Storm Revolution
One Piece: Burning Blood - Bandai Namco
One Piece: Grand Adventure - Bandai Namco
One Piece: Grand Battle - Bandai
One-Punch Man: A Hero Nobody Knows - Spike Chunsoft/Bandai Namco
Saint Seiya: Soldiers' Soul - Dimps
Shijō Saikyō no Deshi Kenichi: Gekitō! Ragnarok Hachikengō - Capcom
Super Dragon Ball Z - Bandai
Yu Yu Hakusho: Dark Tournament - Digital Fiction
Zatch Bell! Mamodo Battles / Konjiki no Gash Bell! Yuujou no Tag Battle 2 - Eighting
Zatch Bell! Mamodo Fury / Konjiki no Gash Bell! Gekitou! Saikyou no Mamonotachi - Mechanic Arms

Crossover
Fighting games featuring characters from more than one franchise. Typically, these consist of characters across multiple game and/or comic franchises. Others are initially singular franchises featuring guest characters, often via DLC.

Aquapazza: Aquaplus Dream Match - Examu
Battle Stadium D.O.N. - Namco Bandai Games / Eighting / Q Entertainment
Blade Strangers - Nicalis
BlazBlue: Cross Tag Battle - Arc System Works
Bounty Battle - Dark Screen Games
Brawlhalla - Blue Mammoth Games
Brawlout - Angry Mob Games
Capcom VS. series - Capcom
Capcom Fighting Evolution
Marvel vs. Capcom series
SNK vs. Capcom
Super Gem Fighter: Mini Mix
Tatsunoko vs. Capcom
Cartoon Network: Punch Time Explosion / Cartoon Network: Punch Time Explosion XL - Papaya Studio
Dead or Alive series - Tecmo
Dead or Alive 4
Dead or Alive: Dimensions
Dead or Alive 5
Dead or Alive 6
Dengeki Bunko: Fighting Climax - Sega
DreamMix TV World Fighters - Bitstep
Fight of Gods - Digital Crafter
Fighters Megamix - Sega / Tiger Electronics
Fighting EX Layer / Fighting EX Layer: Another Dash - Arika
Injustice series - NetherRealm Studios
Injustice: Gods Among Us
Injustice 2
J-Stars Victory VS - Spike Chunsoft
Jump Force - Spike Chunsoft
Jump Super Stars - Ganbarion
Marvel Nemesis: Rise of the Imperfects - Nihilistic / EA Canada / Team Fusion
Mashbox
Mortal Kombat series - Midway Games / Avalanche Software / Eurocom / Just Games Interactive / Midway Studios Los Angeles / Other Ocean Interactive / Point of View, Inc. / NetherRealm Studios
Mortal Kombat vs. DC Universe
Mortal Kombat
Mortal Kombat X
Mortal Kombat 11
MultiVersus - Warner Bros. Interactive Entertainment / Player First Games
NeoGeo Battle Coliseum - SNK Playmore
Nickelodeon All-Star Brawl - Ludosity / Fair Play Labs
Nitroplus Blasterz: Heroines Infinite Duel - Examu
Phantom Breaker / Phantom Breaker: Extra / Phantom Breaker: Omnia - Mages
PlayStation All-Stars Battle Royale - SuperBot Entertainment
Samurai Shodown - SNK
SNK Gals' Fighters - Yumekobo
SNK Heroines: Tag Team Frenzy - SNK / Abstraction Games
SNK vs. Capcom series - Capcom / SNK
Soulcalibur series - Project Soul / Bandai Namco Studios
Soulcalibur II
Soulcalibur Legends
Soulcalibur IV / Soulcalibur II HD Online
Soulcalibur: Broken Destiny
Soulcalibur V
Soulcalibur VI

Street Fighter X Tekken - Capcom
Sunday vs Magazine: Shūketsu! Chōjō Daikessen - Konami
Super Smash Bros. series - Nintendo / HAL Laboratory / Sora / Bandai Namco Studios
Super Smash Bros.
Super Smash Bros. Melee
Super Smash Bros. Brawl
Super Smash Bros. for Nintendo 3DS / Wii U
Super Smash Bros. Ultimate
Teenage Mutant Ninja Turtles: Smash-Up (Wii version) - Game Arts
Tekken 7 - Bandai Namco Studios
The King of Fighters series - SNK / Eolith / BrezzaSoft / Noise Factory
The King of Fighters '94 / The King of Fighters '94 Re-Bout
The King of Fighters '95
The King of Fighters '96
The King of Fighters '97
The King of Fighters '98 / The King of Fighters '98 Ultimate Match
King of Fighters R-1
The King of Fighters '99
King of Fighters R-2
The King of Fighters 2000
The King of Fighters 2001
The King of Fighters 2002 / The King of Fighters 2002 Unlimited Match
The King of Fighters 2003
The King of Fighters: Maximum Impact
The King of Fighters Neowave
The King of Fighters XI
The King of Fighters: Maximum Impact 2 / The King of Fighters: Maximum Impact Regulation-A
The King of Fighters XII
The King of Fighters XIII
The King of Fighters XIV
The King of Fighters XV
Twinkle Queen - Milestone
Under Night In-Birth - French Bread / Ecole Software

Eroge
Fighting eroge (erotic games). Fighting games with pornographic elements.

Battle Raper series - Illusion
Battle Raper
Battle Raper 2

Strip Fighter series - Studio S
Strip Fighter II - Games Express
Strip Fighter IV - Studio S
Super Strip Fighter IV - Studio S
Ultra Strip Fighter IV Omeco Edition - Studio S
Strip Fighter 5 - Studio S
Strip Fighter 5 Abnormal Edition - Studio S
Strip Fighter IV Rainbow - Studio S
Strip Fighter 3 Naked Street King - Studio S
Strip Fighter 5 Chimpocon Edition - Studio S

Variable Geo - TGL / Giga

Mech
Fighters with a mecha or robot theme.

Armored Warriors series - Capcom
Armored Warriors
Cyberbots: Full Metal Madness - Capcom
Gundam: Battle Assault (Series)
Joy Mech Fight - Nintendo
Mighty Morphin Power Rangers: The Fighting Edition - Bandai
Neon Genesis Evangelion: Battle Orchestra - Headlock
One Must Fall: 2097 - Epic Games
Power Quest - Sunsoft

Real Steel - Yuke's
Rise of the Robots - Mirage Media / Time Warner Interactive
Rise 2: Resurrection - Mirage Media / Acclaim Entertainment
Rising Thunder - Radiant Entertainment
Robopit - Kokopeli Digital Studios / Altron
Shin Kidō Senki Gundam Wing: Endless Duel - Natsume Co. Ltd. / Bandai
Super Robot Spirits - Banpresto
Tech Romancer - Capcom
Teleroboxer - Nintendo R&D3
WarTech: Senko No Ronde - G.rev
Virtual On series - Sega

Monster/Kaiju
These games feature monsters as playable characters, usually set in destructible city environments.

Godzilla video games - Toho / Atari

King of the Monsters series - SNK

War of the Monsters - Incognito Entertainment / Sony

RPG
Fighting games with RPG elements, like character building or variable storylines.

Dissidia Series
Dissidia: Final Fantasy
Dissidia 012 Final Fantasy
Dissidia Final Fantasy NT
DNF Duel
Draglade
Dragon Ball Xenoverse - Bandai Namco
Dragon Ball Xenoverse 2 - Bandai Namco
Flying Dragon
Granblue Fantasy Versus - Arc System Works
Marvel Avengers: Battle for Earth - Ubisoft
Persona 4 Arena - Atlus/Arc System Works
Persona 4 Arena Ultimax - Atlus/Arc System Works
Legaia series
Legend of Legaia
Legaia 2: Duel Saga
Red Earth - Capcom

Revengers of Vengeance
Shadow Fight series - Nekki
Tenkaichi Bushi Keru Nagūru
Tobal series
Tobal No.1
Tobal 2
Virtua Quest
Shaolin - THQ
The King of Fighters All Star - Netmarble / SNK

Super deformed
Super deformed refers to a popular type of Japanese caricature where the subject is made to have exaggerated toddler-like features, such as an oversized head and short chubby limbs. Their movements and expressions while super deformed also tend to be exaggerated.

Battle Arena Toshinden series – Tamsoft
Battle Arena Nitoshinden
Exteel – NCsoft (only when "SD Mode" is selected)
Fate/tiger colosseum – Capcom / Cavia / Type-Moon
Flying Dragon series – Culture Brain
SD Hiryū no Ken
SD Hiryū no Ken Gaiden
SD Hiryū no Ken SD Hiryū no Ken Gaiden 2
Flying Dragon (only when "SD Mode" is selected)
SD Hiryū no Ken Densetsu
SD Hiryū no Ken EX
Glove On Fight – Watanabe Seisakujo

Guilty Gear series – Arc System Works
Guilty Gear Petit
Guilty Gear Petit 2
King of Fighters series – SNK
King of Fighters R-1
King of Fighters R-2
Marvel Super Hero Squad – THQ
SNK Gals' Fighters – Yumekobo
SNK vs. Capcom: The Match of the Millennium – SNK
Super Gem Fighter Mini Mix / Pocket Fighter – Capcom
Virtua Fighter series – Sega-AM2
Virtua Fighter Kids

See also
List of beat 'em ups

References

External links
Wiktionary - Appendix:Fighting game terms

Fighting games